Barry Molloy (born 28 November 1983, in Derry) is a retired Irish footballer who played for Drogheda United, Derry City, Crusaders and Finn Harps. He began his career as a youth player at Derby County.

He spent the majority of his career playing with his hometown club Derry City, with whom he served as captain. He is generally considered to be a club legend by the Brandywell fan base.

Molloy was a member of successful Derry squads which won two FAI Cups in 2006 and 2012, and five League of Ireland Cups in 2005, 2006, 2007, 2008, and 2011. He also played a key role in helping Derry return to the Irish  top flight after winning the 2010 League of Ireland First Division.

References

Living people
1983 births
Sportspeople from Derry (city)
Republic of Ireland under-21 international footballers
Republic of Ireland association footballers
Drogheda United F.C. players
Derry City F.C. players
Crusaders F.C. players
Finn Harps F.C. players
Association football midfielders